Forrester RFC is a rugby union football club in the Scottish Rugby Union, located at South Gyle Access in Edinburgh.

History
Forrester Former Pupils Rugby Football Club and Sports Association was founded in 1964 by ex-pupils of Forrester High School.

Most school rugby players joined Corstorphine Rugby Club because there was nowhere else to go but two remarkable English teachers: Fred Langstaff (English Teacher) and Peter Blyth (English Teacher) decided that there were enough good former pupils to start an FP club.

Drew Elliott and his younger brother Kenny Elliott were the first to be inveigled along with not a few good rugby players.

The first few years found Forrester FP playing the Edinburgh fringe rugby teams who wanted nothing more than to enjoy rugby.

1971 found Forrester in the semi finals of the Edinburgh Knockout competition at Murrayfield where they were knocked out by The Bruce Hay led Liberton.

Most of the after training tea drinking was in The Oak in Corstorphine until the maître d decided that rugby players were no better than football players (with brains). The next few years found Forrester FP rugby Club in The Dorlin Hotel, St. John's Road, Edinburgh (no longer in existence).

The Club has participated in the Edinburgh and District League and found success in a number of Rugby Sevens tournaments including the now defunct Edinburgh and District trophy, in 1976.

The former Clubhouse, situated in the grounds of Forrester High School, was opened in September 1977.  In 1987, the existing structure was extended to include changing rooms and showers in addition to other facilities, not least of which was the addition of a small bar.

Forrester players who went on to achieve international honours include Norrie Rowan and Robert Cunningham (Scottish rugby) and Iain McLeod (Queensland Triathlon Champion 2001).

Having been pipped at the post for three successive years, the Club finally won the [Edinburgh District League] in 1986 gaining promotion to Division 6 of the National League in 1990. After reorganisation they found themselves in the Division 5 (East) Regional League at the start of season 1999–00. They finished runners up to Irvine that year but, finally, won promotion to Division 4 by beating Hawick YM 13–12 in the final game of season 2000–01.

The Committee were instrumental in setting up the River Series Cup (later the Alloa Series Trophy) in association with Boroughmuir RFC, which for ten years provided Cup competition in Scotland, and provided the springboard for the SRU Tennents cup competition and ultimately the BT Cellnet Cup. It was perhaps fitting that in the last year of this competition, the Castlemaine XXXX cup was won by Forrester in the gala event.

The Club now stands at a cross-roads, with a massive Youth development programme and ambitious plans for the development of facilities to nurture the talent and enhance the playing standards throughout the area. Although never a "closed" Club, "Former pupils" was dropped from the Club title at the end of season 2000–01.

In 2020, Forrester's Sean Findlay, made the headlines for playing senior club rugby in Scotland for 6 different decades; having started with Stobswell in the 1970s, before joining Forrester in the 1980s where he remained.

Now
A new clubhouse was built under the PPP (Public-Private Partnership) as part of the redevelopment of the area. St Augustine's and Forrester High moved on to a shared campus in January 2010, with the new school building situated on the former football pitches and site of the old clubhouse.

On Sunday 19 August 2012 founders, members, families, coaches, players and many more came together to celebrate the opening of the new rugby pitch at Forrester Rugby Club.

Sevens

The club run the Forrester Sevens tournament.

Club Presidents
 1965-1974 F. Langstaff
 1974-1976 A. Elliott
 1976-1978 A. Jenkins
 1978-1980 J. Nicol
 1980-1982 K. Elliott
 1982-1986 J. Connor
 1986-1991 J. Robertson
 1991-2002 T. Stevendale
 2002-2006 S. Kilpatrick
 2006-2010 C. Lewis
 2010-2015 D. Panther
 2015-2018 E. McComiskie
 2018-2020 G. Smith
 2020-     P. Inglis

Club Captains

Notable players
 Norrie Rowan
 Sam Hidalgo-Clyne
 Robert Cunningham
 Iain McLeod

References

External links
official website

Rugby union in Edinburgh
Scottish rugby union teams
Sports teams in Edinburgh